The 2014 Lusophone Games was the 3rd edition of the Lusophone Games, a multi-sport event that represent athletes from Portuguese-speaking countries and territories. It was held from 18 to 29 January 2014 in the Indian state of Goa.

Brazil and Sri Lanka also put in bids to stage the event. Participating delegations represented every Portuguese-speaking National Olympic Committee and other countries with historic ties to Portugal. The Chairman for these Games was Manohar Parrikar, the chief minister of Goa and the Chief Executive Officer was Keshav Chandra IAS, Secretary to the Government of Goa for Sports and Education. The Games were originally planned to be held in 2013, but was postponed and moved to the January 2014 dates.

Since Goa was elected to host the games, Brazil chose not to send their athletes because of the ¨huge postponement¨ of the competition. Only 7 Brazilian athletes, independently of Brazilian Olympic Committee, competed at the 2014 Lusophone Games.

Participating countries
All ACOLOP member and associated member countries were expected to participate in these Games:
Members

Associate members

Venues

List of 2014 Lusophone Games Venues

Sports

For these Games, 97 events in 9 sports, were contested for medals. Wushu made its debut. The majority of the sports here were contested at the first Lusophone Games in 2006, with the exception of judo, which made its debut in 2009. However, futsal was dropped from these Games, after being contested in both 2006 and 2009.

Calendar

Medal table

Criticism
The organizers of the Games were criticized by political parties over corruption. Indian National Congress spokesperson Durgadas Kamat alleged a  crore scam in the pricing of the Games' medals, grand opening and closing ceremonies, hiring of taxis, as well as in laying out infrastructure.

See also
ACOLOP
CPLP Games
Commonwealth Games
Jeux de la Francophonie

References

External links
Official website
ACOLOP

 
Lusophony Games, 2014
Lusophony Games, 2014
Lusophony Games
2014
International sports competitions hosted by India
Multi-sport events in India
Sport in Goa
2010s in Goa